"Chitty Chitty Bang Bang" is an Academy Award-nominated song from Chitty Chitty Bang Bang, the 1968 musical motion picture.  In the film it is sung by Dick Van Dyke and Sally Ann Howes.  "Chitty Chitty Bang Bang" is also featured prominently in Chitty the Musical, which premiered in London at the Palladium in 2002 and on Broadway in 2005 at the newly refurbished Foxwoods Theatre (then the Hilton Theatre).

This song was covered by Ferrente and Teicher, New Christy Minstrels, and the Chipmunks with David Seville, who sang an extra bridge section, not used in the motion picture version.

The song is parodied in the South Park episode "It Hits the Fan" sung by Mr. Garrison and by Jim Carrey in Ace Ventura: When Nature Calls. 

A reworded version of the song was used in a public information film for the DVLA about failure to pay road tax, in which Chitty Chitty Bang Bang was clamped because Caractacus Potts had failed to pay the road tax.

Steampunk band Abney Park sometimes covers "Chitty Chitty Bang Bang" at live shows.

Songwriters
The song was written by the Sherman Brothers, Robert B. Sherman and Richard M. Sherman.

Stage version reprises
The title song is reprised several times throughout the stage version under slightly different names:
"Chitty Chitty Bang Bang (Nautical reprise)"
"Chitty Takes Flight"
"Chitty Prayer"
"Chitty Flies Home (Finale)"

References

Film theme songs
1968 songs
Dick Van Dyke songs
Songs from Chitty Chitty Bang Bang
Songs about cars
Songs written by the Sherman Brothers